This is a complete List of Moroccan football players in foreign leagues, i.e. association football players who have played in foreign leagues.

The history of Moroccan players in Europe

A large number of Moroccan players played in Europe, especially in France, Belgium and the Netherlands due to the presence of a large Moroccan community there, In the fifties of the twentieth century, there was a Moroccan player who impressed in Europe, especially with Atlético Madrid, who was Larbi Benbarek even though he was playing with the France national team because Morocco was under French protection, Benbarek won La Liga title twice in 1949–50 and 1950–51. In the fifties and beginning of the sixties another Moroccan star appeared Hassan Akesbi, is considered the best Moroccan scorer in European Leagues with 173 goals and the first Moroccan to win a title in Europe when Akesbi won Ligue 1 title with Reims in 1962.

In terms of titles, a large number of Moroccan players achieved titles most of them Badr El Kaddouri with 14 titles five Leagues, four cups and five Super Cup, followed by Sofian Benzouien with 10 titles, all in Luxembourg with F91 Dudelange with seven Leagues more than any other Moroccan player and three cups. Then comes Younès Belhanda with 9 titles five Leagues, three cups and one Super Cup. In terms of the five major Leagues Medhi Benatia won the Bundesliga twice with Bayern Munich and Serie A twice with Juventus More than any other Moroccan player, As for the other players who achieved the league titles in the top 5 leagues in Europe, Salaheddine Bassir and Noureddine Naybet won La Liga in 1999–2000 with Deportivo La Coruña and Ligue 1 six times was won by Hassan Akesbi, Marouane Chamakh and three players in 2011–12 they are Abdelhamid El Kaoutari, Karim Aït-Fana, Younès Belhanda with Montpellier, and the last winner was Nabil Dirar in 2016–17.

At the level of individual titles Mbark Boussoufa won the award for best player in Belgium three times, The first with Gent as for the second and third with Anderlecht, in the Netherlands, the Moroccan players won the award for the best player three times through Mounir El Hamdaoui, Karim El Ahmadi and Hakim Ziyech. as for the level scorers There are five players who have won the top scorer El Hamdaoui is the first Moroccan to achieve the top scorer award in the Eredivisie with AZ Alkmaar season 2008–09. As for more who won the top scorer award, he is Omar Er Rafik twice in Luxembourg with FC Differdange 03. as for more than play games just in the leagues there Karim El Ahmadi with 376 games, Abdelkrim Merry 337 games, Marouane Chamakh 333 games, Noureddine Naybet 329 games and finally Mbark Boussoufa 322 games. on the other hand more than hat-tricks record is Samir Hadji 8 all hat-tricks with Fola Esch then Omar Er Rafik by 7 and finally Hassan Akesbi by 6 hat-tricks. At the level of countries have made Moroccan players 29 titles in the Netherlands, which are thirteen Eredivisie, ten KNVB Cup and six Johan Cruijff-schaal after that Luxembourg twenty one title, fourteen League and seven cups and finally Portugal nineteen titles, eight Primeira Liga, one Taça de Portugal, Taça da Liga and five Supertaça. Other countries where the Moroccan players at least won one title is the 17th state in the following figure Azerbaijan, Belgium, Bulgaria, Cyprus, Germany, Greece, Hungary, Italy, Portugal, Romania, Switzerland, Ukraine, Spain, Moldova, Poland, Slovakia, Denmark, Russia and Turkey.

Gallery

Moroccan descent players played for other national teams 

Khalid Boulahrouz was born in Maassluis, Netherlands to a family of Moroccan descent. He has eight siblings. As a youngster he went to the youth academies of Ajax and Haarlem. When he was sixteen his father died and he had to take responsibility for his family.
Ibrahim Afellay is of Moroccan Riffian descent; his parents left their hometown Al Hoceima in the 1960s to work in the Netherlands. He grew up in Overvecht, a neighbourhood in Utrecht with a large immigrant population. Afellay and his brother, Ali, were brought up by their mother, Habiba, after his father died when he was young., his family are Moroccan Dutch. After both the Moroccan and the Dutch national teams managers selected him for their squads, he was caught in the dilemma to either play for the Moroccan national team, because of his Moroccan descent, or to play for the Dutch team, the Netherlands being his place of birth and residence. He ultimately decided to play for the Dutch national team despite the heavy competition for places in midfield.
Adil Rami  was born in the city of Bastia on the island of Corsica to Moroccan parents. As a youth, his family moved to the mainland, eventually settling in the southern coast city of Fréjus, where his mother worked as a member of the city council. Rami is the third of four children and has two sisters and one brother., Rami is a French international, having made his debut on 11 August 2010 in a friendly match against Norway. Prior to representing France, he drew interest from the Moroccan national team. Ahead of the 2008 Africa Cup of Nations, Rami was offered a chance to play with Morocco at the competition by manager Henri Michel. However, Rami declined the offer, citing his ambition to play for France. He has stated on several occasions that he would prefer to "represent Morocco within the France team".

European League
 Albania 

 Armenia 

 Azerbaijan 

 Belgium 

 Bulgaria 

 Czech Republic 

 Croatia 

 Cyprus 

 Denmark 

 England 

 France 

 Germany 

 Greece 

 Georgia 

 Hungary 

 Iceland 

 Italy 

 Kosovo 

 Luxembourg 

 Lithuania 

 Malta 

 Netherlands 

 Norway 

 Poland 

 Portugal 

 Romania 

 Russia 

 Scotland 

 Slovakia 

 Spain 

 Sweden 

 Switzerland 

 Turkey 

 Ukraine

List All-time top appearances of Moroccan players in European League

Correct as of 30 June 2021 (UTC)

Moroccan players and European Competitions
Bold Still playing competitive football in Europe

Correct as of 11 March 2020 (UTC)

List All-time top goalscorers for the Moroccan players in European Leagues

List All-time top goalscorers for the Moroccan players in European Competitions
Bold Still playing competitive football in Europe

Correct as of 11 August 2021 (UTC)

List of Moroccan players hat-tricks in European League
Position key:
GK – Goalkeeper;
DF – Defender;
MF – Midfielder;
FW – Forward;
4 – Player scored four goals;
6 – Player scored six goals;
* – The home team

Multiple hat-tricks
The following table lists the minimum number of hat-tricks scored by players who have scored two or more hat-tricks.

By Leagues

Moroccan players Titles in European clubs
This statistics of Moroccan players who won titles in Europe where the player must be Moroccan whether he played for the Morocco national football team or from a Moroccan father and mother. He has never been represent another country, but if he plays for another national team and then plays for the Moroccan team he is considered a Moroccan player, and the same thing if he played with teams under-23, under-20 and under-17.

Bold Still playing competitive football in Europe

Summary

List by League

List by Cup

List by League Cup

List by Super Cup

Individual Honours

List Top goalscorers Moroccan players in Europe

Moroccan players of the Year in European Leagues

Most expensive transfers in the history of Moroccan players 

As of 1 August 2020; during the 2020 summer transfer window.

History of Moroccan players in the rest of the world Leagues

League statistics rest of the world

List of Moroccan players hat-tricks in the rest of the world Leagues
Position key:
GK – Goalkeeper;
DF – Defender;
MF – Midfielder;
FW – Forward;
4 – Player scored four goals;
5 – Player scored five goals;
* – The home team

Multiple hat-tricks

By Leagues

Moroccan players Titles In the rest of the world clubs
Bold Still playing competitive football In the rest of the world League

Summary

List by League

List by Cup

List by League Cup

List by Super Cup

List Top goalscorers Moroccan players In the rest of the world clubs

Notes

References

External links
Players Abroad (Morocco) at Soccerway

Football players in foreign leagues
Moroccan in foreign leagues
Morocco
Association football player non-biographical articles